The Musée d’Art et d’Histoire (Museum of Art and History) is the largest art museum in Geneva, Switzerland.

The building
The museum is located in Les Tranchées, in the city centre, on the site of the former fortification ring.  It was built by the architect Marc Camoletti between 1903 and 1910, and financed by a bequest from the banker Charles Galland (1816–1901).  The building is square, with 60 m (200 ft) sides surrounding an inner courtyard.  It has four storeys, with roof lanterns on the top floor, and a total exhibition space of 7,000 m² (75,000 square feet).

The façade is decorated with sculptures by Paul Amlehn:  an allegory of the arts, depicting painting, sculpture, drawing and architecture, is mounted on the triangular gable above the entrance, and two more allegories, of archaeology and applied art, can be seen in the left- and right-hand corners of the building respectively.  The upper frieze includes the names of Genevan artists: Dassier, Baud-Bovy, Saint-Ours, Agasse, Töpffer, Liotard, Calame, Diday, Menn, Petitot, Arlaud and Pradier.

The museum
The museum as an institution dates back to 1826 and the Musée des Beaux-Arts, which opened in what is now the Musée Rath.  The Musée Académique, whose exhibits covered natural history and archaeology, had also been recently founded (in 1818).  The Musée des Beaux-Arts was acquired by the city of Geneva in 1851, which also received the State of Geneva's weapons collection and historical artefacts in 1870.

In the second half of the 19th century these various collections were enlarged through donations, making new exhibition rooms necessary.  In 1897 the Société Auxiliaire du Musée de Genève was founded with the aim of creating a new museum.  In 1900 the city of Geneva held an architecture competition to design a new building.  The Musée d’Art et d’Histoire was finally built from 1903 to 1910 thanks to the bequest from Charles Galland.  However, parts of the collection soon had to be sent out to new museums due to a lack of space.

The Musée d’Art et d’Histoire heads the association for all art and historical museums in the city of Geneva, the Musées d'Art et d'Histoire.  The other museums in this group are the Cabinet des Estampes (graphics), the Musée Ariana (porcelain), the Musée Rath (special exhibitions), the Maison Tavel (history of Geneva), and the Musée de l'Horlogerie et de l'Émaillerie (timepieces and enamels).  The group also includes an art restoration studio, research laboratories, and an art and archaeology library with 400,000 books.

Collections

The fine art section has paintings from the Middle Ages to the 20th century, with works by the Italian, Dutch, French, English, Genevan and Swiss Schools.  The best-known painting is The Miraculous Draught of Fishes (1444) by Konrad Witz, contained in Witz's St. Peter Altarpiece.  Other major artists include Rembrandt, Cézanne, Modigliani, and the sculptor Rodin.  The museum also has numerous works by Jean-Étienne Liotard, Ferdinand Hodler, Félix Vallotton, Edmond Jean de Pury, and Jean-Baptiste-Camille Corot.  The collection of works by the Genevan Neoclassical painter Jean-Pierre Saint-Ours (d. 1809) is much the best of any museum.

The applied art section has collections of Byzantine art, icons, weapons from the Middle Ages and Renaissance, silverware and tinware, musical instruments and textiles.  The complete interior furnishing and wood panelling from several rooms of the Lower Castle Zizers (late 17th century) have been built into the museum.

The archaeology section displays findings from European prehistory, ancient Egypt (with a mummy from the 9th century BC), the Kerma culture of Sudan, the Near East, ancient Greece, and Roman and pre-Roman Italy, as well as a numismatic cabinet.

Notes

External links

Home page (partly available in English)

1826 establishments in Switzerland
History museums in Switzerland
Art museums and galleries in Switzerland
Art museums established in 1826
Museums in Geneva
Order of Arts and Letters of Spain recipients
19th-century architecture in Switzerland